Wolfgang Kuck (born 12 October 1967 in Wülfrath, North Rhine-Westphalia) is a volleyball player from Germany, who played for the Men's National Team in the 1990s and the early 2000s. He earned a total number of 203 caps for the national squad. He was German Volleyball Player of the Year three times: 1994, 1996 and 1997.

References
 Profile

External links
 

1967 births
Living people
German men's volleyball players
Sportspeople from Düsseldorf (region)
People from Mettmann (district)